Skonsvikvatnan is a small lake located along the coast of northern Norway. It is located in Berlevåg Municipality, northwest of the village of Berlevåg in Troms og Finnmark county.

See also
List of lakes in Norway

References

Berlevåg
Lakes of Troms og Finnmark